Guilford County Office and Court Building is a historic office and municipal and North Carolina Superior Court courthouse building located at Greensboro, Guilford County, North Carolina. It was built in 1937, and is a two-story, three part, Art Moderne style brick building. It has a stylized entrance with three unornamented pilasters without capitals, which extend above the roofline.

It was listed on the National Register of Historic Places in 1988.

References

Courthouses on the National Register of Historic Places in North Carolina
Office buildings on the National Register of Historic Places in North Carolina
Moderne architecture in North Carolina
Government buildings completed in 1937
Buildings and structures in Greensboro, North Carolina
National Register of Historic Places in Guilford County, North Carolina